Tiago Sousa (born 29 October 1984) is a Portuguese athlete who competes in the modern pentathlon..

References

External links
 

1984 births
Living people
Portuguese male modern pentathletes
Sportspeople from Lisbon